Wycliff Mathou Kambonde (born 10 January 1988) is a Namibian football midfielder with the Jomo Cosmos of the Premier Soccer League in South Africa.

He previously played for Blue Waters in Namibia.

Kambonde played for the Namibia national football team at the 2008 Africa Cup of Nations, where he appeared in one match.

References

1988 births
Living people
Blue Waters F.C. players
Jomo Cosmos F.C. players
Namibian men's footballers
Namibian expatriate footballers
Namibia international footballers
Namibian expatriate sportspeople in South Africa
2008 Africa Cup of Nations players
Association football midfielders
Expatriate soccer players in South Africa